"Pretty Pimpin" is a song written and performed by American indie rock musician Kurt Vile. The song was released as a single on July 21, 2015, and received a positive reception from music critics.

"Pretty Pimpin" peaked at number 1 on the Billboard Adult Alternative Songs chart, becoming Vile's first chart-topper on a Billboard chart.

Critical reception
"Pretty Pimpin" received favorable reviews from critics. Evan Minsker of Pitchfork awarded it Best New Track, and said that its overall aesthetic is entirely welcome. Kyle McGovern of Spin said that the song is the most engaging and jaunty-sounding single Vile has pushed to radio. Tom Hughes of The Guardian called it one of Vile's "loveliest songs yet, and a great summation of his ingenious-weirdo appeal". The song has also been highlighted as a standout track of its parent album by AllMusic and Consequence of Sound.

Music video
The music video was released on July 21, 2015.

Weekly charts

Certifications and sales

See also
 List of Billboard number-one adult alternative singles of the 2010s

References

2015 songs
2015 singles
Matador Records singles